Big Rock may refer to:

Belize
Big Rock Falls, a waterfall

Canada
Big Rock (glacial erratic), a glacial erratic situated just southwest of Okotoks, Alberta
Big Rock Brewery, a beer brewery located in Calgary, Alberta

United States

Populated places
 Big Rock, Illinois, a village
 Big Rock Township, Kane County, Illinois
 Big Rock, Ohio, an unincorporated community
 Big Rock, Tennessee, an unincorporated community
 Big Rock, Texas, an unincorporated community
 Big Rock, Virginia, an unincorporated community

Geographic locations
 Big Rock, a rock pillar in Glacier County, Montana
 Big Rock, a mountain in Silver Bow County, Montana
 Big Rock (ski resort), a resort in Mars Hill, Maine
 Big Rock Creek (Minnesota), a stream in Minnesota
 Big Rock Point Nuclear Power Plant, a former nuclear power plant in Charlevoix, Michigan
Glen Rock (boulder), also referred to historically as "Big Rock"